Ralli International School is located in Indirapuram, Ghaziabad, Uttar Pradesh. It was started in 2008 by shri Surinder Kumar Ralli. The name of the trust is "Sarvodya Shishu Shiksha Samiti". Neha Ralli is the principal.

References

External links

Reviews
International schools in India
Schools in Ghaziabad, Uttar Pradesh
Educational institutions established in 2008
2008 establishments in Uttar Pradesh